Lorita baccharivora, the groundsel leafroller, is a species of moth of the family Tortricidae. It is native to Florida and Texas, but has been introduced to Australia for the biological control of groundsel bush (Baccharis halimifolia).

The wingspan is about 8 mm. The fore- and hindwings are brown with a faint pattern. There are several generations per year.

The larvae feed on Baccharis halimifolia.

References

Moths described in 1988
Cochylini
Lepidoptera used as pest control agents